Si può fare may refer to:

 Si può fare (album)
 Si può fare (film)